The 12th Indiana Infantry Regiment was an infantry regiment in the Union Army during the American Civil War.

Service
The 12th Indiana Infantry was organized at Indianapolis, Indiana May 27 through August 27, 1862, and mustered in on August 17, 1862, for three year's service under the command of Colonel William H. Link.

The regiment was attached to Cruft's Brigade, Army of Kentucky, August 30. Attached to 2nd Brigade, District of Memphis, Tennessee, XIII Corps, to December 1862. 1st Brigade, 1st Division, District of Memphis, XIII Corps, December 1862. 1st Brigade, 1st Division, XVII Corps, Army of the Tennessee, to January 1863. 1st Brigade, 1st Division, XVI Corps, to July 1863. 1st Brigade, 4th Division, XV Corps, to September 1864. 1st Brigade, 1st Division, XV Corps, to June 1865.

The 12th Indiana Infantry mustered out of service after June 24, 1865. Veterans and recruits were transferred to the 48th Indiana Infantry and 59th Indiana Infantry.

Detailed service

 Left Indiana for Kentucky August 21.
 Battle of Richmond, Kentucky, August 30. Regiment mostly captured.
 Paroled and sent to Indianapolis, for reorganization.
 Action at Lexington, Kentucky, September 2 (detachment).
 Regiment left Indianapolis, for Memphis, Tennessee, November 23, 1862.
 Grant's Central Mississippi Campaign November–December 1862.
 Action at Holly Springs, Mississippi, December 20, 1862.
 Duty at Grand Junction and Colliersville, Tennessee, guarding Memphis and Charleston Railroad until June 1863.
 Ordered to Vicksburg, Mississippi, June 9.
 Siege of Vicksburg June 12-July 4.
 Advance on Jackson, Mississippi, July 4–10.
 Siege of Jackson July 10–17.
 Duty at Big Black until September 28.
 Moved to Memphis, Tennessee, then marched to Chattanooga, Tennessee, September 28-November 20.
 Operations on the Memphis and Charleston Railroad in Alabama October 20–29.
 Chattanooga Campaign November 23–27.
 Tunnel Hill November 23–25.
 Battle of Missionary Ridge November 25.
 March to relief of Knoxville, Tennessee, November 28-December 8.
 Duty at Scottsboro, Alabama, until May 1864.
 Atlanta Campaign May 1-September 8.
 Demonstrations on Resaca May 8–13. Near Resaca May 13.
 Battle of Resaca May 14–15.
 Movements on Dallas May 18–25.
 Battles about Dallas, New Hope Church, and Allatoona Hills May 25-June 5.
 Operations about Marietta and against Kennesaw Mountain June 10-July 2.

 Brush Mountain June 15.
 Assault on Kennesaw June 27.
 Nickajack Creek July 2–5.
 Chattahoochee River July 5–17.
 Battle of Atlanta July 22.
 Siege of Atlanta July 22-August 25.
 Battle of Ezra Chapel, Hood's 2nd sortie, July 28.
 Flank movement on Jonesborough August 25–30.
 Battle of Jonesborough August 31-September 1.
 Battle of Lovejoy's Station September 2–6.
 Operations against Hood in northern Georgia and northern Alabama September 29-November 3.
 Sherman's March to the Sea November 15-December 10.
 Siege of Savannah December 10–21.
 Campaign of the Carolinas January to April 1865.
 Reconnaissance to Salkehatchie River, South Carolina, January 25.
 Battle of Rivers' Bridge February 2–5.
 South Edisto River February 9.
 North Edisto River February 12–13.
 Congaree Creek February 15.
 Columbia February 16–17.
 Battle of Bentonville, March 20–21.
 Occupation of Goldsboro March 24.
 Advance on Raleigh April 10–14.
 Occupation of Raleigh April 14.
 Bennett's House April 26.
 Surrender of Johnston and his army. March to Washington, D.C., via Richmond, Virginia, April 29-May 20.
 Grand Review of the Armies June 24, 1865.

Casualties
The regiment lost a total of 295 men; 8 officers and 92 enlisted men killed or mortally wounded, 2 officers and 193 enlisted men due to disease.

Commanders
 Colonel William H. Link - mortally wounded at the Battle of Richmond; died September 20, 1862
 Colonel Reuben Williams

See also

 List of Indiana Civil War regiments
 Indiana in the Civil War

References

Bibliography
 Dyer, Frederick H. A Compendium of the War of the Rebellion (Des Moines, IA: Dyer Pub. Co.), 1908.
 Gage, Moses D. From Vicksburg to Raleigh; or, A Complete History of the Twelfth Regiment Indiana Volunteer Infantry, and the Campaigns of Grant and Sherman, with an Outline of the Great Rebellion (Chicago, Illinois: Clarke & Co.), 1865.
 Hemphill, William S. Journal of the Kosciusko Guards, Company E, 12th Regiment, Indiana Volunteers (Warsaw, IN: M. Priser), 1993. [originally printed in 1904]
 Williams, Reuben. General Reub Williams's Memories of Civil War Times: Personal Reminiscences of Happenings That Took Place from 1861 to the Grand Review (Westminster, MD: Heritage Books), 2004.  
Attribution
 

Military units and formations established in 1862
Military units and formations disestablished in 1865
Units and formations of the Union Army from Indiana
1862 establishments in Indiana